Mizo cuisine is the traditional cuisine of the Mizo people of Mizoram, India. Mizos are traditionally rice eaters.

Overview  
The cuisine of Mizoram shares characteristics to other regions of Northeast India and North India. Rice is the staple food of Mizoram, while Mizos love to add non-vegetarian ingredients in every dish. Fish, chicken, pork and beef are popular meats among Mizos. Dishes are cooked in any available oil. Meals tend to be blander with less oil and more vegetables. Most Mizos love eating boiled vegetables along with rice but the younger generation tends to like fried and spicy food; food from other cultures are also a popularity among many young Mizo. A popular dish is bai, made from boiling vegetables (the ingredients tend to differ from household to household) with bekang (fermented soybeans) or sa-um, a fermented pork, and served with rice. Sawhchiar is another common dish, made of rice and cooked with beef, pork or chicken.

Dishes
The  staple food of most of the Mizo people is rice, with meat and vegetables served on the side, ranging from the homely bai, a simple vegetable stew, non veg stew with sesame, garlic, onion and herbs.

Side dishes

 Bai – combination of several herbs cooked with string beans and edible ferns.
 Rep – smoked meat (fish, chicken, pork or beef) mixed with flavors of chilies, local herbs and fresh leafy greens
 Chhum han – mixed steamed vegetables.
 Hmarcha rawt - tangy and spicy chilli chutney
 Dal
 Bekang - fermented soya beans

Lunch

Lunch in a Mizo home differs from house to house .Food eaten in lunch can range from Simple biscuits to even noodles and also sometimes " Chhangban" ( A snack prepared from finely ground Sticky rice ) which is usually accompanied by Kurtai( Jaggery ) and tea.
Some of the Items eaten during lunch are : 
 Sanpiau – Rice porridge mixed with meat, sauce and Mizo spices.
 Chhangban – Sticky local rice bread.
 Artui chhipchhuan chow – Sunny-side-up fried egg with noodles
 Alu chop
 Sawhchiar

References 

Culture of Mizoram
Northeast Indian cuisine
Indian cuisine by state or union territory